The Commonwealth Golf Club is a golf club in Oakleigh South, Victoria, Australia. It has hosted many events over the years, notably the Australian Open, Women's Australian Open and Victorian Open.

Winners at Commonwealth
1961 Victorian Open – Alan Murray
1967 Australian Open – Peter Thomson
1972 Victorian Open – Walter Godfrey
2010 Women's Australian Open – Yani Tseng
2011 Women's Australian Open – Yani Tseng

External links

Commonwealth Golf Club course review, Golf Australia

Golf clubs and courses in Victoria (Australia)
Sport in the City of Kingston (Victoria)
Sporting clubs in Melbourne
Buildings and structures in the City of Kingston (Victoria)